Taft most commonly refers to William Howard Taft (1857–1930), 27th president of the United States.

Taft may also refer to:

People
Taft (surname), including a list of people with the name
Taft family, a political dynasty that includes President Taft
Justice Taft (disambiguation)

Place names

Germany
Taft (Ulster), a river of Hesse and Thuringia, tributary of the Ulster

Iran
Taft, Fars, a village in Poshtkuh-e Rostam Rural District
Taft, Yazd, a city in Yazd Province
Taft County, a county in Yazd Province that includes the above city

Philippines
Taft, Eastern Samar
Taft Avenue
Taft Avenue MRT Station

United States
 Taft, California
 Taft, California, former name of Cromberg, California
 Taft, Florida
Taft, Kentucky
 Taft, Louisiana
 Taft, Minnesota
 Taft, Missouri
 Taft, Montana
 Taft, Oklahoma
 Taft, Oregon
 Taft, Tennessee
 Taft, Texas
 Taft, Virginia
 Taft, Wisconsin
 The Taft School in Watertown, Connecticut, founded by Horace Dutton Taft

Other uses
Taft Broadcasting, a former media conglomerate controlled by the Taft family
Synonym for Taffeta
A character in The Tick
Daihatsu Taft (disambiguation), several automobiles
Taft Stettinius & Hollister, a United States law firm